Sir Harold Egbert Allan  (15 March 1895 – 18 February 1953) was a Jamaican politician, legislator and statesman.

Early life
Allan grew up in Portland Parish. He was educated at Mico College, and after graduating became assistant master at Calabar Elementary School, then headmaster at Titchfield Upper School. In 1919, he founded the Capitol Theatre which was the first place to show motion pictures in the parish.

Political career
Allan was elected a member of the Portland Parochial Board in 1928, and was elected for the legislative seat of Portland in 1935. Following unemployment riots in 1938, he visited the United Kingdom to discuss the financial problems in Jamaica with the British government. The following year, he helped establish the Land Settlement system and Unemployment Relief and Rehabilitation Centre in Kingston's west end. He was a key figure in establishing the Jamaican constitution in 1944.

Though he was politically independent, he worked closely with Jamaican Labour Party government leader Alexander Bustamante, and was appointed Minister for Finance and General Purposes in 1945. Two years later, he was appointed representative for Jamaica at the Trade Conference in London.

Allan received an Order of the British Empire in 1943. He was knighted in 1948, becoming the first Afro-Jamaican to receive this honour.

Death and legacy
Allan died on 18 February 1953. In 1979, his wife Lady Edris (née Trottman) Allan donated his papers to the Civil Rights leaders collection at the Amistad Research Center in New Orleans, Louisiana. The Center made microfilm copies of his papers, and gave them to the Institute of Jamaica, the Jamaican Archives and the University of the West Indies.

References

1895 births
1953 deaths
Jamaican Knights Bachelor
Jamaican politicians
Members of the Order of the British Empire
20th-century Jamaican people
Afro-Jamaican